O Meu Pé de Laranja Lima (My Sweet Orange Tree) is a 1980 Brazilian telenovela, based on the book of the same name.

Cast and characters
Alexandre Raymundo .... Zezé
Dionísio Azevedo .... Manuel Valadares (Portuga)
Rogério Márcico .... Paulo
Lucélia Machiavelli .... Estefânia
Baby Garroux .... Jandira
Fausto Rocha .... Raul
Cristina Mullins .... Glória (Godoia)
Lourdes Bicudo .... Lili
Ivan Lima .... Raul
Valdir Fernandes .... Henrique
Dante Rui .... Caetano
Regina Braga .... Cecília
Almir das Areias .... Ariovaldo
Neuza Borges .... Eugênia
Geny Prado .... Donana
Sergio Ropperto .... Gabriel Garcia
Luzia Carmelo .... Santinha
Jefferson Ricart Pezeta .... Sabugo
Terezinha Cubana .... Gilda
Ulisses Bezerra .... Totoca
Davis Carvalho .... Luisinho
Eduardo Silva .... Juvenal
Robien Madrilles Jr .... Vava
Sergio Ribeiro Ferreira .... Serginho
Mirka Rubia Sato .... Badu
Fabio Rodrigues .... Seu Aristides
Vera Nunes .... Leonor Oliveira
Wilma De Aguiar .... Madre Celeste
Henrique Lobo .... a voz do pé de laranja-lima
Maria Ferreira .... Helena (1)
Ivanice Silva .... Helena (2)
Elias Gleizer .... Padre Rosendo
Ênio Gonçalves ....Comendador Vicente Del Nero
Paulo Leite .... Santana
Homero Kossac .... Arcebispo
Leonardo Camilo .... Diogo
José Luiz Di Santi .... Dr. Ricardo

References

External links 
 

Rede Bandeirantes telenovelas
1980 telenovelas
Brazilian telenovelas
1980 Brazilian television series debuts
1981 Brazilian television series endings
Children's telenovelas
Portuguese-language telenovelas